Sulzano is a comune in the province of Brescia, in Lombardy. It is situated on the east shore of Lake Iseo. Its coat of arms shows three golden fishes on blue in the lower half, and two yellow vertical bars in the top half, flanking a letter S on blue and red.

References

External links
Information about a spectacular waterfall just outside Sulzano

Cities and towns in Lombardy